Biddenham is a village and civil parish in the Borough of Bedford in Bedfordshire, England, located around  west of Bedford town centre near the A428 road. It forms part of the wider Bedford urban area.

History 
Biddenham is the location of the Manor Hospital, a BMI Healthcare private hospital. The village also contains St James Church, The Three Tuns pub, and a sports pavilion with a cricket pitch and a rugby field (interchangeable depending on the season).

Sometime before 1920, a short  gauge railway was operated by S.W. Jarvis & Son at the Biddenham Gravel Pit. The line was removed in the 1930s.

Biddenham International School and Sports College is located on Biddenham Turn. It is a state secondary school for Biddenham and the western part of Bedford. The school was originally named John Howard Upper School, but was renamed after a merger with another school in 1988. St Joseph's and St Gregory's Catholic Primary School is also located on Biddenham Turn. The school was formed following the merger of St Joseph's Lower and St Gregory's Middle in September 2017. St. James' Primary School, located on Main Road, is the village's primary school.

See also 
Biddenham Pit - a Site of Special Scientific Interest

References

External links

 Biddenham Parish Council village website
 1929 photo showing the gravel pit railway

Villages in Bedfordshire
Civil parishes in Bedfordshire
Borough of Bedford